Glamour of the Kill (sometimes abbreviated as GOTK) were an English post-hardcore band from York. They had a Kerrang! video of the week with the track "Feeling Alive".

History 
"Glamour of the Kill" were formed in January 2007. They take their name from a line in the title track of He Is Legend's 2004 album, I Am Hollywood. The band's mainstream popularity was assisted by a 10/10 Metal Hammer review for their debut demo EP, Through the Dark They March. This led to tours with Bullet for My Valentine, Darkest Hour and Avenged Sevenfold.

They have cited major influences as Iron Maiden, Metallica, Slayer, Pantera, Megadeth, Judas Priest, Black Sabbath, The Misfits, Black Flag, The Ramones, Nirvana, Sepultura, As I Lay Dying, Killswitch Engage, and Korn.

2008 
In 2008, the band released their first licensed EP, Glamour of the Kill, with independent label Siege of Amida Records. This EP contained a re-recorded version of one of the previous EP's tracks, "Rise From Your Grave". Glamour of the Kill was given positive ratings from critics throughout the UK.

On 15 June, the band made an appearance at Download Festival alongside Coheed & Cambria, In Flames, Within Temptation and others.

2009 
2009 saw the band support the likes of Escape The Fate and Wednesday 13 as well as making as this, GOTK played at the UK leg of Sonisphere, a European festival Headlined by Metallica and Linkin Park. This later led to the band touring with DragonForce in the UK in the winter of 2009. The track "A Hope In Hell" was also featured on the game Dirt 2.

2010 
2010 has already seen the band playing Eurosonic Festival, a massive 38 date headline UK tour with support from Yashin titled "In For The Kill". The band have also appeared at Powerfest, Amsterdam, they also played the Red Bull stage at Download Festival 2010.

On 28 October 2010, the band announced their first studio album, The Summoning. A statement from the band via email to the G.O.L.D Members read "We are very happy to announce that our debut album "The Summoning" will be hitting all stores across Europe on 24 January 2011."

On 13 November 2010, the band released the video for the first single off the upcoming album: "Feeling Alive". The video then went on to become an exclusive on Kerrang! - becoming Video of the Week.

The Summoning (2011) 
On 24 January 2011, Glamour of the Kill released their first full studio album - The Summoning. This album was supported by a 29-date tour of the UK, starting on 17 February at The Lamp in Hull, with the final date on 2 April; when the band played The Cockpit in Leeds. They continued their presence in the Dirt video game series, with "Feeling Alive" being on the soundtrack of Dirt 3.

From 5 October 2011 Glamour of the Kill will be one of the support acts for Forever The Sickest Kids UK tour along with Decade and Action Item. They played in Norwich, Birmingham, Manchester, Leeds, Glasgow, Cardiff, Portsmouth and London. The tour ended on 13 October in London.

For the first time, Glamour of the Kill played their full debut album in its entirety in Manchester, Newcastle, York and Leicester from 15 to 18 December.

Savages (2012–2015) 

The band opened for We Came as Romans and Alesana along with Iwrestledabearonce across Europe and the UK in Jan/Feb. They then joined a European tour with Yashin and Dear Superstar across Europe in March/April. They were then added as the local support for the Newcastle date of the 2012 Jägermeister Music Tour, supporting Skindred, Therapy? and Black Spiders.  The event was performed at the O2 Academy in Newcastle upon Tyne on Thursday 12 April 2012. Shortly after the band signed to eOne Entertainment Music worldwide. October/November saw the band fly out for their first tour of the US on the Inked Music Tour along with Alesana, In Fear and Faith, Vampires Everywhere and This or the Apocalypse. Nov/Dec Band enter the studio to work on their second full-length album with producer Joey Sturgis and engineer Nick Scott.
On 16 July, the first single off the band's upcoming second album, Savages, was released, entitled "Break".

On 3 September, the new music video for "Second Chance" was released on YouTube.

In September 2013, Glamour of the Kill toured alongside The Defiled as the support to Motionless in White on their Infamous UK Tour 2013.

In March and April 2014, the band toured as main support for Heaven's Basement on their Welcome Home Tour.

On 22 July 2015, the band announced that they were splitting up via an official statement on their Facebook page:

Resurrection (2018) 
On 17 March 2018, the band officially announced their comeback.

On 23 October 2018, the band released a new single called "Fire Fight" from the new upcoming album "Resurrection".  The track was mixed and mastered by Innersound Audio Recording Studio.

On 4 January 2019, the music video for "Resurrection", the title track off of the album, was released via the band's YouTube channel. The track was mixed and mastered by Innersound Audio Recording Studio.

Sporadic appearances and future (2019 - Present) 
After the release of "Resurrection" the band went quiet, making only a few posts on social media before disappearing entirely. The final post on Facebook was made on the 17th November 2019; marking the 5 year anniversary since the EP After Hours.

As of 2020 it appears as though GOTK are no longer together as the members do not seem to be working together.

With the beginning of 2022 Davey and Craig are in separate bands, Davey fronting a band called "DeadFlight" Who released their debut album "Arrival" on the 20th January 2022. Craig joined a band called Caskets; formerly known as Captives but had to change the name due to an Australia based band trademarking the name "Captives". Caskets released their full length debut on 13th of August 2021. Mike and Ben appear to be working outside the music industry.

Band members
 Davey Richmond – lead vocals, bass (2007–2015; 2018–2019)
 Mike Kingswood – lead guitar, backing vocals (2007–2015; 2018–2019)
 Chris Gomerson – rhythm guitar, backing vocals (2007–2015)
 Ben Thomson – drums, backing vocals (2007–2015; 2018–2019)
 Craig Robinson – rhythm guitar, backing vocals (2018–2019)

Discography
Studio albums
The Summoning (2011)
Savages (2013)

EPs
Through the Darkness They March (2007)
Glamour of the Kill (2008)
After Hours (2014)
Compilations
Maiden Heaven: A Tribute to Iron Maiden, 2 Minutes to Midnight. (16 July 2008)

References

External links

Official website (archived)

Musical groups established in 2004
Musical quintets
Musicians from York
English metalcore musical groups